A playscape is either a piece of land modified for children's play (a natural playscape), a particular structure on a playground, or a nontraditional type of play environment. Landscape architects and designers are increasingly using the term to express areas of cities that encourage interaction and enjoyment for all ages. The term was probably first used in the mid-twentieth century, possibly first attributable to the National Institute for Architectural Education in 1957, and associated in the 1960s with the New York-based Playground Corporation of America. It is mentioned by Joe Frost in his 1992 book, Play and Playscapes, referring to attempts to replace or add on to the rubberised surface, metal and plastic of traditional playgrounds.

Playscapes may or may not incorporate traditional playground equipment like swings, slides, and climbers. When they do so, they may incorporate slides or climbers in a more cohesive way than typical playgrounds do—often into embankments. Playscapes may also offer a wide range of open-ended play options that allow people to be creative and use their imagination including sand or earth to sculpt and blocks or other materials to build with.

The term playscape can function at similar scales as the term playground—describing an entire play area or a large part of the play area designated for a certain age group. It may also be applied at a larger scale to describe play landscapes that are organised in non-traditional ways (e.g. along greenways). Playscapes may be defined by clear boundaries or through their shaping of the landscape to encourage play and interaction. Landscape architects and designers are increasingly using the term to refer to areas of cities that encourage interaction and enjoyment for all ages.

History 
The term was probably first used in the mid-twentieth century. It is possibly first attributable to the National Institute for Architectural Education in 1957.

The landscape architect Garrett Eckbo was among those who used the term playscape to describe his work. In a Spring 1960 article in Landscape Architecture (now Landscape Architecture Magazine), Eckbo used the term playscape to refer to a play landscape his firm Eckbo, Dean Austin Landscape Architects designed for the Longwood urban renewal project in Cleveland, Ohio:“The central play park became a playscape: a bowl of contoured grassy mounds and hollows, bordered with sheltering specimen trees, and incorporating a little grove of steel poplars, a family of concrete turtles, a fantastic village, contoured sand pit, saddle slide, jumping platform, and the terraced tile wading pool developed around William McVey’s abstract sculpture…” The term was associated in the 1960s with the New York-based Playground Corporation of America.

It is mentioned by Joe Frost in his 1992 book, Play and Playscapes, referring to attempts to replace or add on to the rubberised surface, metal and plastic of traditional playgrounds.

Safety
Playscapes are designed to eliminate fall heights. Playscapes have rolling hills and fallen logs rather than a central play structure with monkey bars. Playscapes have much lower injury rates than standard playgrounds.

Playscapes have a fraction of the number of child injuries compared to standard playgrounds with play structures. The most frequent injury to children on playgrounds is a fracture of the upper limb resulting from falls from climbing apparatuses.  The second most common cause of injury to children on playgrounds is falls from slides.  Fall heights are the largest safety issue for most safety inspectors.

Playscapes combat the issue of fall heights by using topography changes for children to climb and experience changes in height. Companies in Canada have made strides in reducing fall height by using topography as a main feature in their designs.  Topography changes allow designers to be creative when placing components in the playscape.

Developmental benefits
Playscapes offer a wide range of benefits such as increasing physical activity, fine and gross motor skills & cognitive development.
They are also used in horticultural therapy for rehabilitation of mental and/or physical ailment. They increase participation rates and decrease absenteeism, decrease bullying, decrease injury rates, increase focus and attention span and help with social skills in schools. Playscapes have shown to increase children's level of physical activity, and motor ability. Playscapes are found to be very beneficial in the growth and development of children both mentally and physically. Cognitive development, focus, attention span and social skills are all improved.

Design
Playscapes are not intimidating regardless of ability or fitness level. Playscapes have no central location, or prescribed area of play. They are open-ended spaces that entice children to use their imagination and creativity. Playscapes do not prescribe in an area that encourages a physical hierarchy, thus reducing bullying and competition based on physical strength and ability.

Playscapes are not limited to public parks and schools.  Select hospitals in Sweden and North America have playscapes on their facility.  Hospitals use playscapes for horticultural therapy, which has proven to increase emotional, cognitive, and motor improvements and increased social participation, quality of life and well-being.

Since 2006 Landscape Architects Adam White and Andrée Davies have pioneered the playscape approach to play space design in the UK. They have won a number of design and community engagement awards each year for their work; these have included: RHS Gold Medal and BBC Peoples Choice Award, Landscape Institute Communication & Presentation Award, Horticultural Weekly Award and Children and Young Peoples Services Award for genuine community design engagement.

In 2009 they won the award for the 'UK's Best Play Space' at the Horticultural Week Awards and were shortlisted for December's BALI Construction Awards and the UK Landscape Architects Design Awards. In 2007 and they were reported as ‘ahead of the game’ in their profession by the Sunday Telegraph, and in June 2009 they were profiled in The Times for their recently completed Lyric Theatre Roof Terrace Garden in Hammersmith, London.

Natural playground
Nature playgrounds use natural landscapes, natural vegetation, and materials in a creative and interactive way for child play and exploration. Nature playscapes are created for the enhancement of a child's curiosity, imagination, wonder, discovery, to nurture a child's connectedness and affinity for the world around them. Using native plants, rolling hills, and many trees, these playscapes may represent a natural place such as a forest. Playscapes are designed with the intent of bringing people back to nature. (See Richard Louv's Last Child in the Woods: Saving Our Children from Nature Deficit Disorder, 2005).

North Carolina State University Landscape Design professor, Robin C. Moore, has been designing and studying both nature playgrounds and urban playscapes for many years. His 2014 book, Nature Play and Learning Places: Creating and Managing Places Where Children Engage with Nature, was written in collaboration with Alan Cooper of the US National Wildlife Federation. This user-friendly text is a resource for stakeholders wanting to both view and consider elements to include in a playscape design. Many other books are available that serve as guides for playscape creation, too.

The technological age has changed the ways in which children play. It is therefore up to parents, communities and schools to re-introduce to children what it means to play in the outdoors.

Play components may include earth shapes (sculptures), environmental art, indigenous vegetation (trees, shrubs, grasses, flowers, lichens, mosses), boulders or other rock structures, dirt and sand, natural fences (stone, willow, wooden), textured pathways, and natural water features.

See also
 Children Youth and Environments Journal
 Buddy bench

References

Moore, R.C. (2014). Nature play and learning places: Creating and managing places where children engage with nature. (With A. Cooper) Raleigh, NC: Natural Learning Initiative and Reston, VA: National Wildlife Federation.

Frost, J.L. (1992). Play and playscapes. Clifton Park, NY: Delmar.

Play (activity)
Types of garden
Landscape architecture